Temu cruckshanksii (Mapudungun: temu) is a species of plant in the family Myrtaceae. It is endemic to Chile. It is threatened by habitat loss. The purported variety "Heaven Scent" sold commercially is likely just the unimproved plant.

Taxonomy
The species was described as Temu cruckshanksii by Otto Karl Berg in 1861, but was later placed in the genus Blepharocalyx. It was returned to Temu after a phylogenetic analyses of tribe Mytreae found Blepharocalyx to be polyphyletic.

Description
The plant grows to be 15 meters with a trunk diameter of approximately 50 centimeters. The bark is smooth and reddish brown.  Leaves are oval-shaped, while the flowers are white and arranged in inflorescences.  Fruits are round, dark brown with hints of reddish tone, and taste bitter.

The toponym Temuco (city in Chile) comes from this tree, meaning in mapuzungun "Temu water" or "temu in the water" ("co" means water in Mapuche).

References

cruckshanksii
Near threatened plants
Taxonomy articles created by Polbot
Taxobox binomials not recognized by IUCN